Bene AG is a European office furniture product and services company. In its 2006–07 business year, the Bene Group posted revenues of €198.6 million and employed 1,217 people.

Bene engages in development and manufacturing and provides sales and consultancy services. The company's European network of retailers distributes its products and services. The company has 74 points of sale in 29 countries.

The independent subsidiary Bene Consulting provides advisory services and office property management from its offices in Waidhofen an der Ybbs, Vienna, and Frankfurt, Germany.

Bene Solutions develops, designs and produces office furniture.  Founded in 1790, Bene started to manufacture office furniture on an industrial level in 1951. Since the early 1970s, Bene has been undisputed market leader in Austria and now holds a share of 25% in that market.

Since the 1980s, Bene has embarked on an international strategy of growth, opening offices in London and Moscow in 1988. In 1989, the company moved from its previous production site in Zell to its present head office in Waidhofen an der Ybbs designed by architect Laurids Ortner.

Between 1995 and 1998, Bene focused on expanding its sales network to central and eastern Europe and established outlets in the Czech Republic, Hungary, Poland, Romania, Slovakia and Slovenia. In 1998, the Bene group entered the German market by purchasing the Objektform. From 2000 to 2003, Bene started to expand in western Europe and established outlets in Benelux and France.  During that period, the floor space of the manufacturing site in Waidhofen was extended from 9,000 m2 to 40,000 m2, followed by further modernization efforts, with investments totaling approximately €22 million.

In 2003, Bene established a joint venture in Poland named Bene Nowy Styl S.A. With a new outlet in Dubai, the company is now also represented in the Middle East. 2004 was again marked by international growth: A cooperation agreement was signed with the Japanese office furniture manufacturer KOKUYO CO., LTD, in a first step to enter the Asian market. Bene also expanded sales into Croatia and Serbia.

In August 2004 a financial syndicate led by Unternehmensinvest AG (UIAG) came on board. In 2006, Bene successfully achieved ISO 9001 and 14001 certification. In the same year, Bene was transformed into a joint stock company (AG). Its IPO at the Wiener Börse was followed by the UIAG financial syndicate's exit from the company. Bene engaged in a strong expansion drive and enlarged its sales network to include Bulgaria, Ukraine, Spain, Ireland and Kuwait. The German TILL Group, an office furniture dealer and former Bene distribution partner, was taken over in November of the same year. In April 2007, Bene acquired his long-term business partner in Belgium.

Facts

External links 
 Official site: www.bene.com
 Bene-Showroom at PureAustrianDesign.com

Companies established in 1790
Furniture retailers
Austrian brands
1790 establishments in Austria
Manufacturing companies of Austria
Economy of Lower Austria